The 1987 Virginia Slims of New England was a women's tennis tournament played on indoor carpet courts in Worcester, Massachusetts in the United States and was part of the Category 4 tier of the 1987 WTA Tour. It was the third edition of the tournament and was held from November 2 through November 8, 1987. Pam Shriver won the singles title.

Champions

Singles
 Pam Shriver defeated  Chris Evert 6–4, 4–6, 6–0
 It was Shriver's 4th title of the year and the 17th of her career.

Doubles
 Elise Burgin /  Rosalyn Fairbank defeated  Bettina Bunge /  Eva Pfaff 6–4, 6–4
 It was Burgin's 2nd title of the year and the 18th of her career. It was Fairbank's 1st title of the year and the 14th of her career.

References

External links
 ITF tournament edition details

Virginia Slims of New England
Virginia Slims of New England
Virginia
Virginia